John Paynter may refer to:
 John Pender Paynter (1788–1856), British Royal Navy officer
 John Paynter (RAF officer) (1898–1918), World War I Royal Naval Air Service flying ace
 John Paynter (composer) (1931–2010), British composer and music educator
 John Lawrence Paynter (died 1995), Canadian diplomat
 John Paynter (footballer) (born 1960), Australian rules footballer
 John H. Paynter (1862–1947), African American writer of poetry and nonfiction

See also 
 John Painter (disambiguation)
 John Payntor (died 1540), English MP